Naughton ( or ) is an Irish Gaelic surname derived from the name Ó Neachtain meaning 'descendant of Nechtan'. A Sept of the Dal gCais of the same stock as Quinn and Hartigan where located in Inchiquin Barony, County Clare.

Another O'Neachtain Sept of the Uí Maine who were chiefs of Máenmaige, the plain lying around Loughrea in Galway, until the Cambro-Norman invasion. After the upheaval they settled in the Fews (Barony of Athlone, County Roscommon).

The English surname Norton has occasionally been substituted for Naughton. The Nortons of Athlone are descended from Feradach O'Neachtain who died in 1790. In County Kerry, Behan or Behane was used interchangeably with Naughton.

Places 
 Naughton, Fife, Scotland
 Naughton, Ontario, Canada
 Naughton, Suffolk, England
 Naughton Park
 Naughton Gallery at Queen's
 Naughton Township, Burleigh County, North Dakota

Surname of people 
 Aaron Naughton (born 1999), Australian rules footballer
 Albert Naughton (1929–2013), English rugby league footballer of the 1940s, 1950s and 1960s (brother of Danny Naughton)
 Bill Naughton (1910–1992), Irish-born British playwright
 Bobby Naughton (born 1944) American jazz vibraphonist
 Cathal Naughton (born 1987), Cork hurler
 Charlie Naughton (1886–1976), Scottish comedian, member of The Crazy Gang see also Naughton and Gold
 Christina and Michelle Naughton, American piano duo
 Curtis Naughton (born 1995), English rugby league footballer of the 2010s
 Danny Naughton, English rugby league footballer of the 1940s and 1950s (brother of Albert Naughton)
 David Naughton (born 1951), American actor and singer
 Denis Naughten (born 1973), Irish politician
 Eileen S. Naughton (born 1945), American politician
 Eoghan Ó Neachtain (1867–1957), Irish writer, fl. 1901–1932.
 James Naughton (born 1945), American actor
 Joe Steve O Neachtain (1942–2020), Irish actor and playwright.
 Joel Naughton (born 1986), is an Australian catcher for the Philadelphia Phillies Baseball organization.
 John Naughton (born 1946), Irish academic and journalist
 Keith Naughton, Republican political consultant
 Kyle Naughton (born 1988), English footballer currently playing for Swansea City
 Liam Naughten (1944–1996), Irish Fine Gael politician
 Martin Naughton (businessman) (born 1940) Irish entrepreneur
 Martin Naughton (hurler) (born 1964), Galway Hurler
 Dr. Michael J. Naughton, Director of the Center for Catholic Studies, University of St. Thomas - St. Paul, Minnesota
 Naturi Naughton (born 1984), American singer and actress
 Packy Naughton (born 1996), American baseball player
 Patrick Naughton (born 1965), American software developer who co-created the Java programming language
 Rear Admiral Richard J. Naughton (1946–2011), former Superintendent of the U.S. Naval Academy.
 Seán Ó Neachtain (born 1947), former Irish Fianna Fáil politician.
 Sinéad Ní Neachtain, (born 1971) Irish editor
 Tommy Naughton, former manager of the Dunlin Senior Hurling team
 Willie Naughton (1870–1906), Scottish footballer
 Willie Naughton (footballer, born 1962), Scottish footballer

Similar surnames
 MacNaughton is of Scottish origin and they are descended from the eighth century Pictish King Nechtan.
 See Norton (disambiguation)
 The surnames Nocton, Neactain, Nechtan, Naughten and Quinn come from the same name as Naughton

Historical forms of the name
The surname had undergone a change over the years. Naghtens or O'Naghtens (1870).

References

Surnames of Irish origin
Septs of the Dál gCais
Irish families
Scottish surnames